is a 2001 action-adventure game developed and published by Nintendo. The game was a launch title for the GameCube and was the first game in the Mario franchise to be released for the console; it was released in Japan on September 14, 2001, in North America on November 18, 2001, in Europe on May 3, 2002, and in Australia on May 17, 2002. It is the second video game in which Luigi is the main character instead of Mario, after Mario Is Missing!. Players control him as he explores a haunted mansion, searches for Mario and deals with ghosts by capturing them through a vacuum cleaner supplied by Professor E. Gadd.

Luigi's Mansion received a positive critical reception overall, with reviewers praising Martinet's voice acting as Luigi, the atmosphere, soundtrack and gameplay, but criticizing its short length. The game has sold over 3.3 million copies, and is the fifth-best-selling GameCube game of all time. It was one of the first games to be re-released as a Player's Choice title on the system. The game was followed by two sequels – Luigi's Mansion: Dark Moon, released for the Nintendo 3DS in 2013, and Luigi's Mansion 3, which was released for the Nintendo Switch in 2019. A remaster of Luigi's Mansion for the 3DS, co-developed by Nintendo and Grezzo, was released in 2018.

Gameplay

Luigi's Mansion'''s story takes place over four "areas", or sets of explorable rooms between boss fights. Players may also access a training room and a gallery at Professor E. Gadd's laboratory between areas or upon starting the game. In each area, players control Luigi to explore the mansion's rooms and hunt down the ghosts within them, acquiring keys to get through locked doors and eventually fighting a boss ghost at the end of the area. To assist him in his task, Luigi uses a flashlight and two inventions supplied by E. Gadd – the Poltergust 3000, a specially modified, high-powered vacuum cleaner; and the Game Boy Horror, a play on Nintendo's Game Boy Color.

To capture ghosts, Luigi must first stun a ghost with his flashlight, revealing its heart. He then must use the Poltergust 3000 to suck them up, steadily reducing the ghost's hit points to zero, at which point they are captured. The more hit points, the more time it takes for a ghost to be captured, giving them a chance to break free while leaving Luigi more exposed to harm. If Luigi's HP is reduced to zero from being hurt by the ghosts or other accidents, the game is over. Along his journey, Luigi locates three elemental medals, each granting the Poltergust with the ability to summon and vacuum ghosts from fire, water, and ice sources and expel their respective elements to capture specific ghosts or solve puzzles. In addition to capturing the regular ghosts in the mansion, Luigi must catch "portrait ghosts" from some rooms, each requiring a condition be met to make them available for capture. Rooms are usually dark upon initial access, and Luigi hums nervously to the music, but once all the ghosts are captured, it brightens up, and Luigi pleasantly whistles the melody.

Using the Game Boy Horror, players can access a map of the mansion, seeing which rooms they have visited, what doors are open, and which remain locked. When Luigi finds a key during his explorations, the Game Boy Horror automatically indicates which door it unlocks. In addition to a map function, the device keeps track of any treasure that Luigi has found. Rooms will usually have treasure hidden within, which can be either coins, bills, gold bars, or gems, hidden within objects and even in chests that appear when rooms are cleared. Luigi can gather these treasures by walking into them or vacuuming them; if a ghost harms Luigi, he will drop a few coins that he will need to recover before they disappear. After Luigi encounters a group of Boos hiding in the mansion, the GB Horror can be used to find each one hiding in a room through a beeper sound and a flashing yellow light on the device, which turns red when Luigi is close to one. Boos can only be located in cleared rooms. Boos are trickier to catch, as they can plant decoys and traps within objects they can hide in that can fool the GB Horror and will escape into other rooms if they can.

Once an area is completed, all portrait ghosts are restored to their paintings by E. Gadd, which the player can view in his laboratory's gallery, at which point a result screen reveals the portrait ghosts Luigi has managed to capture, along with the total amount of treasure he recovered for that stage. Once the final boss of Luigi's Mansion is defeated, the player is given a rating (A to H) during the end credits based on the amount of treasure Luigi has found. Completing the game once unlocks a second mode called the "Hidden Mansion", which features a stronger Poltergust and stronger ghosts. In the European version of this mode, the mansion appears as a mirrored reflection of the previous version, bosses are more difficult, ghosts and Portrait Ghosts are trickier to capture, and more ghosts appear in some of the rooms.

Plot
Luigi has been notified about winning a mansion in a contest he did not enter. He informs Mario and they agree to meet up outside the mansion that evening. Luigi follows a map to the mansion, which is located in a dark forest, and finds it more sinister-looking than the supplied photo. With Mario nowhere to be found, Luigi enters the mansion alone. He encounters a ghost, which attacks him, but is unexpectedly saved by a scientist who unsuccessfully tries to suck up the ghost with a vacuum cleaner. They escape as more ghosts appear, and the scientist introduces himself as Professor Elvin Gadd, or E. Gadd for short. He explains the mansion is supernatural in origin and only appeared a few days prior. E. Gadd tells Luigi that he saw Mario heading towards the mansion, but has not seen him since. Upon learning that Mario is Luigi's brother, E. Gadd entrusts Luigi with his ghost-hunting equipment, including the Poltergust 3000 vacuum cleaner and Game Boy Horror communication device, and Luigi re-enters the mansion to look for Mario.

As Luigi explores the mansion, he discovers that it is an illusion built by King Boo to shelter the now-freed special ghosts that E. Gadd had previously captured and turned into paintings with a large machine dubbed the "Ghost Potrificationizer"; King Boo subsequently created the false contest to lure the Mario Bros. into a trap in retaliation for the boos they defeated in the past. After recapturing many ghosts and working his way through the mansion, Luigi confronts King Boo, who has turned Mario into a painting. King Boo pulls Luigi into the painting for their final battle, using a suit-like replica of Bowser to combat him in an arena resembling the mansion's roof. Finding a way to blast the suit's head off, Luigi catches King Boo and escapes the painting. E. Gadd turns King Boo into a painting along with the recaptured ghosts, while Luigi uses the Ghost Portrificationizer's reverse function to free Mario. After the mansion disappears, E. Gadd uses the treasure Luigi collected on his adventure to build him a new non-haunted house in its place. Its size depends on how much treasure the player gathered during the game.

Development
The game was revealed at Nintendo Space World 2000 as a technological demo designed to show off the graphical capabilities of the GameCube. The full motion video footage had scenes seen in later trailers and commercials for the game, but were not used in the final release. This footage includes Luigi screaming in horror at the camera, running from an unknown ghost in the Foyer, ghosts playing cards in the Parlor, ghosts circling around Luigi, and a gloomy-looking Luigi standing outside the mansion with lighting flashing. These were animated at three graphic houses to pay homage to the GameCube. Soon after its creation, Nintendo decided to transform the demo into a full-fledged video game. A year later, Luigi's Mansion was shown at the Electronic Entertainment Expo alongside the GameCube console. Development was led by Hideki Konno, Shigeru Miyamoto, and Takashi Tezuka. A newer version of the game, more closely related to the final version, was revealed at Nintendo Space World 2001.

The original plan for Luigi's Mansion involved a game where the levels revolved around a large mansion or complex. Tests were later done with Mario characters in dollhouses and such. Once it was transitioned into a GameCube project, Luigi was selected as the main character in order to keep the game original and new. The other gameplay ideas, such as ghosts and the ghost-sucking vacuum cleaner, were added later. Older concepts, such as a role-playing game-like system which made real-time changes to rooms, as well as a cave area located under the mansion, were scrapped due to the inclusion of the new ideas.Luigi's Mansions music was composed by Shinobu Tanaka and Kazumi Totaka, and as such contains "Totaka's Song", a song featured in almost every game that Totaka has composed. It is found by waiting on the controller configuration screen at the Training Room for about three and a half minutes. The main theme of Luigi's Mansion was orchestrated and arranged by Shogo Sakai for Super Smash Bros. Brawl. The game featured voice actors Charles Martinet as the voice of Mario and Luigi, and Jen Taylor as the voice of Toad. Luigi's Mansion received an award for its audio by BAFTA Interactive Entertainment Awards in 2002.

All GameCube systems support the display of stereoscopic 3D, and Luigi's Mansion was planned to utilize this feature; however, 3D televisions were not widespread at the time, and it was deemed that compatible displays would be too cost-prohibitive for the consumer. As a result, the feature was not enabled outside of development.

Reception

Commercially, Luigi's Mansion is the most successful GameCube launch title and the best-selling game of November 2001. It sold 257,000 units during its first week on sale in the United States. According to Nintendo, the game was a large driving force behind the GameCube's launch sales and sold more copies in its opening week than Super Mario 64 had managed to sell. Despite meager sales in Japan at around 348,000 units in total, it became the fifth best-selling GameCube game in the United States, with sales of roughly 2.19 million units. In total it sold 3.33 million copies worldwide by 2020. It was also one of the first Player's Choice titles on the console, along with Super Smash Bros. Melee and Pikmin.

Critically, Luigi's Mansion was positively received, with reviewers praising the game's graphics, design, and gameplay. GameSpot stated that Luigi's Mansion "features some refreshing ideas" and "flashes of brilliance." The gaming magazine Nintendo Power praised the game for being "very enjoyable while it lasts, with its clever puzzles and innovative game play." GameSpy said that the game features "great visuals, imaginative game design and some classic Nintendo magic." The game was referred to as "a masterful example of game design" by GamePro. Game Revolution stated that "the graphics are quite beautiful and the interesting game mechanics are enjoyable." The American-based publication Game Informer praised the gameplay, and referred to it as "brilliant and up to par with Miyamoto's best." The audio was praised by IGN, who considered Luigi's voice acting as "cute, humorous and satisfying", and GameSpy, who declared that the soundtrack remains "subtle, amusing and totally suitable throughout the game". The Japanese video game publication Famitsu awarded the game with a gold rating, and noted that the control system, while tricky at first, works well.

The game has also received criticism, mainly because of its length. GameSpot said that Luigi's Mansion "fails to match the classic status of Mario's adventures" and that the "short amount of time it takes to complete it makes it a hard recommendation." The review, however, also considered that the short length prevents the gameplay and audio from getting tiresome. GameSpot later named Luigi's Mansion the most disappointing game of 2001. GameSpy also criticized the game's length, saying that it could be beaten in about six hours. Allgame declared that Luigi's Mansion "ultimately fails to deliver a cohesive gameplay experience over the long-term." Fran Mirabella III of IGN felt that the game was sub-par, due to its "predictable, formulaic gameplay." G4's TV show X-Play criticized Luigi's Mansion in their special on Mario games and media, calling the game a letdown for players waiting for the first Mario game on the GameCube. Luigi's Mansion was awarded the 2002 BAFTA Interactive Entertainment Award for audio. The game placed 99th in Official Nintendo Magazine's 100 greatest Nintendo games of all time.

LegacyLuigi's Mansion introduces two characters, Professor Elvin Gadd, or E. Gadd for short, and King Boo. E. Gadd has reappeared in other Mario games, such as Mario Party 6 and Mario & Luigi: Partners in Time. E. Gadd is referenced in Super Mario Sunshine as the creator of Mario's F.L.U.D.D. device and Bowser Jr.'s paintbrush. He also appears as a playable character skin in Super Mario Maker. King Boo has also reappeared in other games, either as a boss (including Super Mario 64 DS and Super Princess Peach) or a playable character (including Mario Kart: Double Dash and Mario Super Sluggers).

The mansion in the game has reappeared in other Mario games, usually acting as Luigi's home stage. It appeared in Mario Kart: Double Dash!!, Mario Kart DS, Mario Kart 7, Mario Kart 8 Deluxe, Mario Power Tennis, Mario Super Sluggers, Mario Hoops 3-on-3, Mario Sports Mix, Super Smash Bros. Brawl, Super Smash Bros. for Wii U and Super Smash Bros. Ultimate. The Wii U launch title Nintendo Land features Luigi's Ghost Mansion, a multiplayer minigame based on Luigi's Mansion. In this minigame, four players controlling Miis dressed up as Mario, Luigi, Wario and Waluigi have to drain the energy of a ghost, while the GamePad player, controlling the ghost, must make all the other players faint before time runs out.

A direct sequel for the Nintendo 3DS, Luigi's Mansion: Dark Moon, was released in March 2013, almost twelve years after the release of Luigi's Mansion, to celebrate the Year of Luigi. In 2015, Nintendo released Luigi's Mansion Arcade, an arcade game based on Luigi's Mansion: Dark Moon developed by Capcom and published by Sega. The game uses the same plot as Dark Moon, but goes for a first-person, on-rails gameplay style, and utilizes a special vacuum-based controller. The game is mostly found in Japanese arcades, although some cabinets have been localized and released at select Dave and Buster's locations in the United States. A third installment, titled Luigi's Mansion 3, was released for the Nintendo Switch on October 31, 2019.

3DS remake
A remake of Luigi's Mansion for the Nintendo 3DS, co-developed by Nintendo and Grezzo, was announced on March 8, 2018, and released on October 12, 2018. 

Several years prior to the remake's official announcement as a commercial project, Shigeru Miyamoto designed a working prototype of the game running on a 3DS development kit to test the system's hardware and 3D functionality, which ultimately led to the development of Luigi's Mansion: Dark Moon. The remake has amiibo functionality and supports gyroscopic controls, the Circle Pad Pro accessory, the C-Stick on New Nintendo 3DS models, and stereoscopic 3D. Four other new features were added as new content: local cooperative play in which a second player takes on the role of a doppelgänger named "Gooigi", a new control option that allows the use of the Strobulb flashlight from Dark Moon, an achievement list, and a boss rush mode where up to two players can attempt to clear boss fights as fast as possible. All regional releases of the remake also incorporate elements from the PAL version's Hidden Mansion, increasing the difficulty of the second quest in the North American and Japanese versions. As of 2018, it has sold 90,410 copies in Japan, making it the third best-selling Nintendo 3DS release of 2018 behind WarioWare Gold and Detective Pikachu''.

Critical reception to the remake was generally positive; reviewers appreciated the effort put into the revamped visuals and many believe the core experience to largely hold up 17 years after the original release. Outlets also spoke positively about the implementation of stereoscopic 3D and the two screens as well as the new content such as the boss rush mode and the PAL Hidden Mansion.

Notes

References

External links
  for GameCube (in Japanese)
 Official website for Nintendo 3DS port (multilingual)

2001 video games
Action-adventure games
GameCube games
Single-player video games
Video games about ghosts
Video games about size change
Luigi video games
Nintendo 3DS eShop games
Nintendo 3DS games
Nintendo Entertainment Analysis and Development games
Video games developed in Japan
Video games produced by Shigeru Miyamoto
Video games produced by Takashi Tezuka
Video games scored by Kazumi Totaka
Video games that use Amiibo figurines
BAFTA winners (video games)
Video games produced by Kensuke Tanabe